This article details the qualifying phase for badminton at the 2016 Summer Olympics. The Olympic qualification period takes place between May 4, 2015 and May 1, 2016, and the Badminton World Federation rankings list, scheduled to publish on May 5, 2016, will be used to allocate spots. Unlike the previous Games, nations could only enter a maximum of two players each in the men's and women's singles, if both are ranked in the world's top 16; otherwise, one quota place until the roster of thirty-eight players has been completed. Similar regulations in the singles tournaments also apply to the players competing in the doubles, as the NOCs could only enter a maximum of two pairs if both are ranked in the top eight, while the remaining NOCs are entitled to one until the quota of 16 highest-ranked pairs is filled.

Qualifying standards
Qualification of these Games will be based on the BWF Ranking list to be published on May 5, 2016, providing a total of 16 pairs in each doubles event, and 38 players in each singles event in the following criteria:

Singles:
Ranking 1-16: Players are taken in turn. A NOC may enter up to a maximum of 2 players, provided both are ranked in the top 16.
Ranking 17 and below: Players are taken in turn. A NOC may enter a maximum of 1 player.
Doubles:
Rankings 1–8: Pairs are taken in turn. A NOC may enter up to a maximum of 2 pairs, provided both pairs are ranked in the top 8.
Rankings 9 and above: Pairs are taken in turn. A NOC may enter a maximum of 1 pair.

Each of the five continental confederations will be guaranteed at least one entry in each singles and doubles event (this is called the Continental Representation Place system). If this has not been satisfied by the entry selection method described above, the highest ranked player or pair from the respective continent will qualify. A NOC can qualify players or pairs in a maximum of two events through the Continental Representation Place system; if a NOC qualifies for more than two events through the Continental Representation Place system, the NOC must choose which of them are qualified, and the quota place declined will be offered to the next NOC's eligible player or pair. For each player who qualifies in more than one discipline, an unused quota place will be allocated to the next best ranked eligible athlete of a respective gender in the singles events on the BWF Ranking List as of May 5, 2016.

Host nation Brazil has been entitled to enter a male and a female badminton player in each of the singles tournaments, but more than two players may be permitted if they have achieved the qualifying regulations. Meanwhile, six quota places are made available to eligible NOCs through the Tripartite Commission Invitation, with three each in the men's and women's singles.

Summary

Qualified players
The color pink signifies that a player has been withdrawn from the competition.
BWF Olympic Qualification (May 5, 2016)

Men's singles

Women's singles

Men's doubles

Women's doubles

Mixed doubles

References

Qualification for the 2016 Summer Olympics
Qualification